Axis My India is an Indian polling agency headquartered in Mumbai.
In the 2019 Indian general election, Axis My India was noted by The Pioneer to have "successfully predicted not only the winning party but also the range of their mandate." It could not forecast the BJP forming a majority government on its own in the 2014 Indian general election. 
It publishes Exit polls but does not publishes Opinion polls that are done before the election. It stopped publishing Opinion polls since 2017.

Election predictions

2022 Goa Legislative Assembly election

2022 Manipur Legislative Assembly election

2022 Punjab Legislative Assembly election

2022 Uttar Pradesh Legislative Assembly election

2022 Uttarakhand Legislative Assembly election

Clients
 India Today group 
 TAM India

Reference 

Companies based in Mumbai
Opinion polling in India
Polling companies
Public opinion research companies in India